Calvin Berle Swenson (April 16, 1948 – January 1, 2014) was a Canadian professional ice hockey forward.

Early life

Swenson was born in Watson, Saskatchewan.

Playing career

Swenson played 102 games in the World Hockey Association with the Winnipeg Jets.

Death

Swenson died suddenly on January 1, 2014, aged 65.

Awards and achievements
MJHL First All-Star Team (1967)
 WCJHL Second All-Star Team (1968)
In 1970, he scored the fastest hat trick in the Central Hockey League's history, in 1 minute, 44 seconds.

References

External links
 

1948 births
2014 deaths
Brandon Wheat Kings players
Canadian ice hockey forwards
Flin Flon Bombers players
Ice hockey people from Saskatchewan
Winnipeg Jets (WHA) players